The 1958 Washington Senators won 61 games, lost 93, and finished in eighth place in the American League, 31 games behind the New York Yankees. They were managed by Cookie Lavagetto and played home games at Griffith Stadium.

Offseason
 January 23, 1958: Pete Runnels was traded by the Senators to the Boston Red Sox for Norm Zauchin and Albie Pearson.
 February 25, 1958: Milt Bolling was traded by the Senators to the Cleveland Indians for Pete Mesa (minors).

Regular season
Pedro Ramos led the American League in losses.

Season standings

Record vs. opponents

Opening Day lineup

Notable transactions
 May 14, 1958: Whitey Herzog was purchased from the Senators by the Kansas City Athletics.
 May 14, 1958: Al Cicotte was purchased by the Senators from the New York Yankees.
 June 23, 1958: Al Cicotte was traded by the Senators to the Detroit Tigers for Vito Valentinetti.

Roster

Player stats

Batting

Starters by position
Note: Pos = Position; G = Games played; AB = At bats; H = Hits; Avg. = Batting average; HR = Home runs; RBI = Runs batted in

Other batters
Note: G = Games played; AB = At bats; H = Hits; Avg. = Batting average; HR = Home runs; RBI = Runs batted in

Pitching

Starting pitchers
Note: G = Games pitched; IP = Innings pitched; W = Wins; L = Losses; ERA = Earned run average; SO = Strikeouts

Other pitchers
Note: G = Games pitched; IP = Innings pitched; W = Wins; L = Losses; ERA = Earned run average; SO = Strikeouts

Relief pitchers
Note: G = Games pitched; W = Wins; L = Losses; SV = Saves; ERA = Earned run average; SO = Strikeouts

Farm system

References

External links
1958 Washington Senators at Baseball-Reference
1958 Washington Senators team page at www.baseball-almanac.com

Minnesota Twins seasons
Washington Senators season
1958 in sports in Washington, D.C.